Iris Sachet (born 29 May 1994) is a French racing cyclist, who currently rides for French amateur squad Team Elles–Groupama–Pays de la Loire. Sachet was a member of the  team in 2016, 2018 and its first UCI season in 2019.

Major results

2015
 6th Cholet Pays de Loire Dames
 7th Overall Tour of Chongming Island
 9th Road race, UEC European Under-23 Road Championships
2018
 4th Grand Prix International d'Isbergues
2019
 6th La Picto–Charentaise

References

External links

1994 births
Living people
French female cyclists
Cyclists from Nantes